Troopers Three is a 1930 American Pre-Code comedy film directed by Norman Taurog and B. Reeves Eason and produced and distributed by Tiffany Studios.

Plot
Eddie Haskins (Lease), a wisecracking young man, teams up with two ham-acrobats known as 'Bugs & Sunny' (Karns and Summerville). When they are all kicked out of a vaudeville theater in California, they enlist in the U. S. Cavalry.

Eddie falls in love with Dorothy Clark (Gulliver), the daughter of a sergeant and, following a moonlight tryst, they are discovered by Sergeant Hank Darby (London) who himself is in love with Dorothy. They have a fist-fight in which Eddie comes out second best.

When Darby is reprimanded for fighting with an enlisted man, the troopers incorrectly think that Eddie squealed on him, and they punish him with a conspiracy of silence. Dorothy also rejects him. Eddie has a problem. Maybe a fire will break out in the stables and he can rescue Sergeant Darby.

Cast
Rex Lease as Eddie Haskins
Dorothy Gulliver as Dorothy Clark
Roscoe Karns as "Bugs"
Slim Summerville as "Sunny"
Tom London as Sgt. Hank Darby
Joseph W. Girard as Capt. Harris (credited as Joseph Girard)
Walter Perry as Halligan
Murdock MacQuarrie as Army Officer

Preservation status
The film exists in a 25-minute truncated version.

References

External links

1930 films
1930 comedy films
Films directed by Norman Taurog
1930s English-language films
Lost American films
American comedy films
American black-and-white films
Tiffany Pictures films
1930 lost films
Lost comedy films
1930s American films